John K. Williams (1822–1880) was an American lawyer and legislator. Born on August 22, 1822, in McKean County, Pennsylvania, he studied law in Meadville, Pennsylvania and practiced law. In 1846, he moved to Shullsburg, Wisconsin Territory. Williams practiced law and managed farm property in Lafayette County, Wisconsin Territory. In 1850, he served in the Wisconsin State Assembly as a Democrat, succeeding fellow Democrat William H. Johnson. Williams was chief clerk in the Wisconsin State Senate in 1852 and 1853. He was also clerk of the Wisconsin Circuit Court for Lafayette and was regent for the University of Wisconsin. Williams died in Shullsburg, Wisconsin, on April 4, 1880.

References

1822 births
1880 deaths
People from McKean County, Pennsylvania
People from Shullsburg, Wisconsin
Pennsylvania lawyers
Wisconsin lawyers
Businesspeople from Wisconsin
Employees of the Wisconsin Legislature
County officials in Wisconsin
19th-century American politicians
19th-century American businesspeople
19th-century American lawyers
Democratic Party members of the Wisconsin State Assembly